Jo Jung-eun (born March 10, 1996) is a South Korean actress. She is known for her role as young Jang-geum in 2003 TV series Dae Jang Geum.

References

External links

1996 births
Living people
South Korean television actresses
South Korean film actresses
South Korean child actresses